{{DISPLAYTITLE:C20H25N3O}}
The molecular formula C20H25N3O may refer to:

 Lysergic acid 2-butyl amide (LSB)
 Lysergic acid diethylamide (LSD)
 Methylisopropyllysergamide
 Prodigiosin

Molecular formulas